

Women's 400 m Freestyle - Final

Women's 400 m Freestyle - Heats

Women's 400 m Freestyle - Heat 01

Women's 400 m Freestyle - Heat 02

Women's 400 m Freestyle - Heat 03

400 metres freestyle
2006 in women's swimming